Dahl is a village in the commune of Goesdorf, in north-western Luxembourg.  , the village has a population of 233.

External links
 

Villages in Luxembourg
Wiltz (canton)